Wasted on the Dream is the eighth studio album by American duo JEFF the Brotherhood. It was released in March 2015 under Infinity Cat Recordings.

Track listing

References

2015 albums